The  Campeonato Argentino de Rugby 2001  was won by the selection of Unione di Córdoba that beat in the final the selection of Buenos Aires
The 23 teams participating were divided on three levels: "Campeonato", "Ascenso", "Promocional".

Rugby Union in Argentina in 2001

National
 The title of  Buenos Aires Champsionship was not assigned.
 The Cordoba Province Championship was won by La Tablada.
 The North-East Championship was won by Huirapuca SC.

International
 In June the "Pumas" went to New Zealand for a series four matches. They beat Counties Manukau and Thames Valley, but lost to the All Blacks and New Zealand Maori.

 in July is Argentina, beat  Italy (38-17)

 In November "The Pumas" went to Europe. Plays four matches, winning the tests with Wales and Scotland.

 The Pumas close the year hosting New Zealand.  After a great match, they lost to a late try by the All Blacks (20-24)

 In November a "development team" won the 2001 South American championship

"Campeonato" 
Two pools di 4 teams. The first two to semifinals, third and fourth to the relegation playout.

Pool A 

Ranking:

Pool B 

Ranking:

Semifinals

Final

Play Out 

 Relegated: Chubut and Salta

"Ascenso"

Pool A 

 
Ranking:

Pool B 

Ranking:

External links 
  Memorias de la UAR 2001
  Francesco Volpe, Paolo Pacitti (Author), Rugby 2002, GTE Gruppo Editorale (2001)

Campeonato Argentino de Rugby
Argentina